Aditi is a female given name in India. Aditi may refer to:

Fictional characters 
 Aditi, mother of gods, according to the Vedas

People 
 Aditi Ashok, Indian professional golfer
 Aditi Avasthi, Indian entrepreneur
 Aditi Arya, Indian actor, model, research analyst and beauty pageant
 Aditi Balan, Indian film actress
 Aditi Banerjee, practicing attorney
 Aditi Bhagwat, Indian classical dancer
 Aditi Bhatia, Indian television actress
 Aditi Chauhan, Indian women's professional footballer
 Aditi Chengappa, Indian actress mostly appearing in Telugu cinema
 Aditi Gupta, Indian author
 Aditi Govitrikar, Indian model
 Aditi Kapil, playwright of Bulgarian and Indian descent
 Aditi Khorana, Indian American author
 Aditi Kinkhabwala, American sports reporter
 Aditi Lahiri, India-born German linguist
 Aditi Mangaldas, Indian classical dancer
 Aditi Mittal, Indian stand-up comedian, actress and writer
 Aditi Mohsin, Bangladeshi singer
 Aditi Mutatkar, Indian badminton player
 Aditi Pant, Indian oceanographer
 Aditi Phadnis, Indian political writer
 Aditi Prabhudeva, Indian film and television actress
 Aditi Pratap, Indian television actress
 Aditi Rao, Indian activist
 Aditi Rao Hydari, Indian actress
 Aditi Rathore, Indian television actress
 Aditi Ravi, Indian model and actress
 Aditi Sajwan, Indian television actress
 Aditi Sarangdhar, Indian Marathi actress
 Aditi Sharma, Indian actress
 Aditi Sharma, Indian cricketer
 Aditi Shankardass, British neuroscientist
 Aditi Singh, Indian film actress
 Aditi Singh Rana, Indian shooter
 Aditi Singh Sharma, Indian playback singer
 Aditi Soondarsingh, chess player
 Aditi Vasudev, Indian film actress

References 

Hindu given names
Indian feminine given names
Feminine given names